Undzhi or Unji (Unjí) is a village and jamoat in north-west Tajikistan. It is located in Ghafurov District in Sughd Region. The jamoat has a total population of 45,760 (2015).

It is a suburb of Khujand and is known for its fruit and vegetable market, thanks to the abundance of agriculture in the area. Notable streets in the town include Oktyabr Street.

References

Populated places in Sughd Region
Jamoats of Tajikistan